Howard Bergins (born 18 October 1954) is a South African cricketer. He played in 22 first-class matches between 1975 and 1987.

See also
 International cricket in South Africa from 1971 to 1981

References

External links
 

1954 births
Living people
South African cricketers
Boland cricketers
Place of birth missing (living people)